Arnold Ruiner (8 February 1937 – 28 October 2011) was an Austrian cyclist. He competed in the individual road race at the 1960 Summer Olympics. He was born in Vienna, his profession was a locksmith.

References

External links
 

1937 births
2011 deaths
Austrian male cyclists
Olympic cyclists of Austria
Cyclists at the 1960 Summer Olympics
Cyclists from Vienna
20th-century Austrian people